The 2017–18 Charlotte 49ers men's basketball team represented the University of North Carolina at Charlotte during the 2017–18 NCAA Division I men's basketball season. The 49ers, led by interim head coach Houston Fancher, played their home games at the Dale F. Halton Arena as members Conference USA. They finished the season 6–23, 2–16 in C-USA play to finish in last place. They failed to qualify for the C-USA tournament.

On December 14, 2017, head coach Mark Price was fired after a 3–6 start to the season and was replaced by Fancher. Houston Fancher was named interim coach for the remainder of the season. On March 6, 2018, new athletic director Mike Hill fired Fancher. On March 19, the school hired Virginia associate head coach Ron Sanchez as their new head coach.

Previous season 
The 49ers finished the 2016–17 season 13–17, 7–11 in C-USA play to finish in 10th place. They lost to UAB in the first round of the C-USA tournament.

Offseason

Departures

Incoming transfers

2017 recruiting class

Roster

Schedule and results 

|-
!colspan=12 style=| Non-conference regular season

|-
!colspan=12 style=| Conference USA regular season

References 

Charlotte
Charlotte 49ers men's basketball seasons